Eleven ships of the Royal Navy have been named HMS Squirrel after the animal, while four more carried the name while serving as fishery protection vessels. Another was planned, but was renamed before being launched.

 was a discovery vessel perennially commanded by explorer Sir Humphrey Gilbert, and lost with all hands in 1583.
 was a 4-gun yacht launched in 1694 and sold in 1714.
 was a 20-gun sixth rate launched in 1703 and captured later that year by French privateers.
 was a 20-gun sixth rate launched in 1704. She was captured by the French in 1706 and renamed Ecureuil. She was retaken in 1708 but subsequently foundered.
 was a 24-gun sixth rate launched in 1707. She was rebuilt in 1727 and was sold in 1749.
HMS Squirrel was to have been a 24-gun sixth rate. She was renamed  in 1742, and launched in 1743.
 was a 20-gun sixth rate launched in 1755 and sold in 1784. Commercial interests purchased her and renamed her Union. She then became a Greenland whaler (1784-1790), a slaver (c.1790-1795), and then made two voyages for the British East India Company.
 was a 24-gun sixth rate launched in 1785 and sold in 1817.
 was a 12-gun brig-sloop launched in 1853 and broken up in 1879.
 was a coastguard cutter built in 1866 and sold in 1905.
 was a coastguard vessel launched in 1904. She was used as a cable ship from 1914 and was sold in 1921 and renamed Vedra.
 was an  launched in 1944 and scuttled off Phuket Island, Thailand in 1945 after being damaged by a mine.
 HMS Squirrel was a name assigned to fishery protection vessels. The name was born in succession by:
 HM MFV 1151 between 1948 and 1956.
 HM MSML 2154 between 1956 and 1957.
  between 1957 and 1959.
  between 1959 and 1968.

Battle honours
 Louisburg 1758
 Quebec 1758

Royal Navy ship names